Oak Valley is a rural residential locality in the City of Townsville, Queensland, Australia. In the  Oak Valley had a population of 487 people.

Geography
The locality is loosely bounded to the north-east by the Flinders Highway and the Great Northern railway line.

Stanley is a neighbourhood in the locality.

History
The neighbourhood of Stanley takes its name from the Stanley railway station, which was after railway engineer Henry Charles Stanley.

Antill Plains Aerodrome was a military airfield operated from 1942 to 1945 during World War II. It is now privately operated as Montpelier Airpark at 1259 Old Flinders Highway.

In the 2011 census, Oak Valley had a population of 420 people.

In the  Oak Valley had a population of 487 people.

Heritage listings
Oak Valley has a number of heritage-listed sites, including:
 12 Chisholm Trail: Tobacco Kiln

Education 
There are no schools in Oak Valley. The nearest primary school is Wulguru State School in Wulguru to the north-west. The nearest secondary school is William Ross State High School in Annandale to the north-west.

Facilities
The Townsville City Council operate a mobile library service which visits the fire brigade shed at Oak Valley every second Wednesday afternoon.

References 

Suburbs of Townsville
Localities in Queensland